Jesse M. Martin (March 1, 1877 – January 22, 1915) was best known as the acting governor of the U.S. state of Arkansas from January 11, 1909, to January 14, 1909. Senator Martin served as Acting Governor of Arkansas for three days until the inauguration of Governor George W. Donaghey.

Martin became acting governor after the expiration of the state senate term of Xenophon Overton Pindall. Pindall had served as acting governor during the unexpired term of John Sebastian Little when Little was unable to serve due to physical and mental illness.

Background
Jesse M. Martin was born the fifth of eleven children on a farm near London, Arkansas to Jasper J., a farmer, and Martha (née Johnson) Martin. Jesse helped his father on the farm but also taught school after completing his own education. At age 22, he was a law student at Hendrix College and later University of Arkansas. After graduating, he was the circuit of clerk for Pope County for four years. Afterwards, he was admitted to the Arkansas Bar Association and became a partner in the firm Brooks, Hays & Martin. Martin started his political career in 1909 when he was elected to represent his district and was re-elected in 1909. After this term, he was president of the Arkansas State Senate and afterwards lieutenant governor of Arkansas. In 1909, he was Governor of Arkansas for three days until George Washington Donaghey was elected. In 1902, he married Mollie Ferguson and they had one son, Ferguson (born 1905).

See also
 List of governors of Arkansas

References

External links
http://www.encyclopediaofarkansas.net/encyclopedia/entry-detail.aspx?entryID=112
State of Arkansas Governors

1877 births
1915 deaths
19th-century American politicians
Acting Governors of Arkansas
Democratic Party Arkansas state senators
Democratic Party governors of Arkansas
People from Pope County, Arkansas